The New Zealand Security Intelligence Service (NZSIS or SIS) is New Zealand's primary national intelligence agency. It is responsible for providing information and advising on matters including national security (including counterterrorism and counterintelligence) and foreign intelligence. It is headquartered in Wellington and overseen by a Director-General, the Minister of New Zealand Security Intelligence Service, and the parliamentary intelligence and security committee; independent oversight is provided by the Inspector-General of Intelligence and Security.

SIS was established on 28 November 1956 with the primary function of combating perceived increases in Soviet intelligence operations in Australia and New Zealand. Since then, its legislated powers have expanded to increase its monitoring capabilities and include entry into private property. Its role has also expanded to include countering domestic and international terrorism, chemical, biological, and cyber threats.

The organization has been criticised for its role in numerous high-profile incidents such as the 1974 arrest of Bill Sutch on charges of spying for the Soviet Union, the 1981 assassination attempt by Christopher Lewis on Queen Elizabeth II, and the 1996 invasion of GATT Watchdog organiser Aziz Choudry's home. It has also been criticised for its failures to anticipate or prevent incidents such as the 1985 bombing of the Rainbow Warrior, the 2004 purchasing of New Zealand passports by Israeli "intelligence contract assets", and the 2019 Christchurch Mosque Shootings by an Australian alt-right white supremacist terrorist.

History

Origins and predecessors
In the first half of the 20th century, domestic intelligence and counter-subversion were primarily in the hands of the New Zealand Police Force (1919–1941; 1945–1949) and the New Zealand Police Force Special Branch (1949–1956). During the Second World War, the short-lived New Zealand Security Intelligence Bureau (SIB) took over. The SIB was modeled after the British MI5 and was headed by Major Kenneth Folkes, a junior MI5 officer. However, the conman Syd Ross duped Major Folkes into believing that there was a Nazi plot in New Zealand. After this embarrassment, Prime Minister Peter Fraser dismissed Folkes in February 1943 and the SIB merged into the New Zealand Police. Following the end of the war in 1945, the police force resumed responsibility for domestic intelligence.

On 28 November 1956, the First National Government established the New Zealand Security Service (NZSS). Its goal was to counter increased Soviet intelligence operations in Australia and New Zealand in the wake of the Petrov Affair of 1954, which had damaged Soviet-Australian relations. The NZSS was again modeled on the British domestic intelligence agency MI5 and its first Director of Security, Brigadier William Gilbert, was a former New Zealand Army officer. Its existence remained a state secret until 1960.

Formalisation and expansion of mandate
The NZ Intelligence Community (NZIC) developed further in the late 1950s due to growing concerns about political terrorism, improvements in weaponry, news media coverage, and frequent air travel. As terrorist threats grew, along with potential connections to wider groups, the adoption of counter-insurgency techniques increased in New Zealand. In response to this, the New Zealand Parliament enacted the 1961 Crimes Act to allow improved targeting of possible terrorist suspects and scenarios. In 1969 the NZSS was formally renamed the New Zealand Security Intelligence Service. That same year Parliament passed the New Zealand Security Intelligence Service Act to cover the agency's functions and responsibilities.

Various amendments were later made to the Security Intelligence Act, including the controversial 1977 amendment under Prime Minister Robert Muldoon, which expanded the SIS's powers of monitoring considerably. The 1977 Amendment Act defined terrorism as: "planning, threatening, using or attempting to use violence to coerce, deter, or intimidate". The Immigration Amendment Act of 1978 further expanded the definition of terrorism.

In 1987, Gerald Hensley, Chair of the NZIC, stated that the State Services Commission became attracted to the concept of "comprehensive security", taking into account not only human-made threats such as terrorism but also natural hazards. This was also a response to the severing of intelligence-sharing arrangements New Zealand had with the United States in 1985 over nuclear policy. Following the attempted hijacking of an Air New Zealand flight and the bombing of the Rainbow Warrior in 1985, Parliament enacted the International Terrorism (Emergency Powers) Act 1987. The Act gave censorship powers to the government around matters of national security and terrorism. This was a significant departure from New Zealand's previous conformance to international norms and laws.

At the end of the 20th Century and beginning of the 21st, the NZIC adapted to emerging chemical, biological, and eventually cyber threats. These three areas became a key point of integration between the intelligence community agencies. Cases of terrorism overseas promoted the NZ Intelligence Community to regularly exchange information and meet the growing demands of addressing non-state actors.

Purpose
The SIS is a civilian intelligence and security organisation. Its stated roles are:
To investigate threats to security and to work with other agencies within Government, so that the intelligence it collects is appropriately used and threats which have been identified are disrupted
To collect foreign intelligence
To provide a range of protective security advice and services to Government.

As a civilian organisation, the SIS's remit does not include enforcement (although it has limited powers to intercept communications and search residences). Its role is intended to be advisory, providing the government with information on threats to national security or national interests. It also advises other government agencies about their own internal security measures, and is responsible for performing checks on government employees who require security clearance. The SIS is responsible for most of the government's counter-intelligence work.

In 2007, it was reported that the SIS wished to expand its role into fighting organized crime.

Organisation
The SIS is based in Wellington, with branches in Auckland and Christchurch. It has close to 300 full-time staff.

Independent oversight of its activities is provided by the Inspector-General of Intelligence and Security.

Directors

The SIS is administered by a Director-General.  it has had seven directors generals:
Brigadier Sir William Gilbert KBE DSO (1956–1976)
Judge Paul Molineaux CMG (1976–1983)
Brigadier Lindsay Smith CMG CBE (1983–1991)
Lieutenant General Don McIver CMG OBE (1991–1999)
Richard Woods (1999–2006)
Warren Tucker (2006–2014)
Rebecca Kitteridge CVO (2014–present)

Public profile
The SIS has been involved in a number of public incidents and controversies:

Bill Sutch affair
In 1974, the SIS was the source of information that led to the arrest of Bill Sutch, an economist and former civil servant, on charges of spying for the Soviet Union. Sutch was acquitted and the SIS was criticised for having accused him, although it has also been alleged that the SIS was correct in its accusation.

1981 Springbok tour
In 1981, the SIS was criticised for drawing up a list of 15 "subversives" who participated in protests against the 1981 Springbok Tour, a visit by South Africa's apartheid rugby team. Characterising individual protesters as "subversives" was deemed by many to be a violation of the right to protest government decisions.

1981 Briefcase leak
Also in 1981, a SIS operative inadvertently left a briefcase, containing a copy of Penthouse, three cold meat pies, and notes of a dinner party hosted by a German diplomat, on a journalist's fence in Wellington, where it was found by the son of another journalist, Fran O'Sullivan.

1985 Rainbow Warrior bombing
In 1985, the SIS failed to prevent the French operation in which DGSE operatives bombed the Greenpeace vessel Rainbow Warrior, killing a photographer.

1980s Cold War embassies espionage operations
In early June 2020, Radio New Zealand reported that the NZSIS had raided the Czechoslovakian embassy in Wellington in 1986 as part of a joint operation with the British Secret Intelligence Service (MI6) to steal Warsaw Pact codebooks in order to break into the encrypted communications of Soviet-aligned countries during the Cold War. This operation would have breached the Vienna Convention on Diplomatic Relations. This revelation came to light as a result of an RNZ podcast series called The Service, produced by Wellington writer and documentary maker John Daniell, whose mother and step-father had both worked for the NZSIS. Daniell said that his step-father was involved in the raid and had claimed it was a success. Daniell's account was corroborated by Gerald Hensley, who served as the head of the Prime Minister's Department under the-then Prime Minister David Lange, and former NZSIS officer Kit Bennetts. In response, both former Prime Minister Helen Clark and Andrew Little, who is the Minister in charge of the NZSIS and Government Communications Security Bureau (GCSB), refused to confirm that they had authorised raids on embassies based in New Zealand. RNZ also reported that the SIS had spied upon Labour MP Richard Northey under the pretext of his support for racial equality and nuclear disarmament. At the time of the spying, Northey was chair of the Justice and Law Reform Select Committee, which was responsible for financial oversight of the SIS, and of legislation altering its powers.

Surveillance of left-wing, peace, and Māori activists
In 1996, two SIS agents broke into the home of Aziz Choudry. Choudry was an organiser with GATT Watchdog, which was holding a public forum and rally against an APEC (Asia-Pacific Economic Cooperation) Trade Ministers meeting hosted in Christchurch. The Court of Appeal ruled that the SIS had exceeded their legislated powers of interception. Parliament later amended the SIS Act to give the SIS powers of entry into private property.

In 2004, it was alleged that the SIS was spying on Māori individuals and organisations, including those associated with the new Māori Party, for political purposes under the codename "Operation Leaf". A government inquiry led by the Inspector-General of Intelligence and Security later rejected these claims in April 2005. The prime minister, Helen Clark called the allegations "baseless". The Sunday Star-Times, the original source of the story, printed a full apology and retraction.

In December 2008, it was discovered that a Christchurch resident, Rob Gilchrist, had been spying on peace organisations and individuals including Greenpeace, Iraq war protesters, animal rights and climate change campaigners. He confessed to the allegations after his partner, Rochelle Rees, found emails sent between him and Special Investigation Group (SIG) officers, having found the emails while fixing Gilchrist's computer. Rochelle Rees was a Labour party activist as well as an animal rights campaigner. Gilchrist was said to have passed on information via an anonymous email address to SIG officers including Detective Peter Gilroy and Detective Senior Sergeant John Sjoberg. SIG is connected with SIS. Gilchrist had been paid up to $600 a week by police for spying on New Zealand citizens, reportedly for at least 10 years. Gilchrist also said he was offered money by Thomson Clark Investigations to spy on the Save Happy Valley Coalition, an environmental group. The incident implied members of New Zealand political parties were spied on by SIS and SIG.

Ahmed Zaoui affair
In 2002, the SIS issued a security risk certificate for Ahmed Zaoui, an Algerian asylum-seeker, and recommended his deportation. Zaoui was detained under a warrant of commitment. Inspector General Laurie Greig resigned in March 2004 after controversy over comments perceived as biased against Zaoui. The risk certificate was subsequently lifted, allowing Zaoui to remain.

2004 Israel-NZ passport scandal
In July 2004, the SIS was criticised for not knowing that Israeli "intelligence contract assets" had been in New Zealand fraudulently purchasing New Zealand passports. This came to light when the New Zealand Police discovered the fraud. The case became world news and an embarrassment for both the SIS and Mossad. Two of the Israelis involved (Uriel Kelman and Eli Cara who had been based in Australia) were deported to Israel, while two non-Israelis believed to be involved (American Ze'ev Barkan and New Zealander David Reznic) left New Zealand before they were caught.

Surveillance of students
In November 2009, the SIS was criticised for asking university staff to report their colleagues or students if they were behaving suspiciously. The SIS said it was part of an effort to prevent the spread of weapons of mass destruction.

2011 Investigation of alleged Mossad operation
In July 2011, the SIS was involved in an investigation of Israeli backpackers who were in New Zealand at the time of the 2011 Christchurch earthquake, in which one of the Israelis was killed. The Israelis were alleged to have been Mossad agents attempting to infiltrate the New Zealand government's computer databases and steal sensitive information. The investigation concluded that there was no evidence of a Mossad operation.

1981 Attempted assassination of Queen Elizabeth II
In March 2018, the SIS released a memo confirming that an assassination attempt was made on Queen Elizabeth II during her 1981 visit in Dunedin despite alleged efforts by the New Zealand Police to cover up the incident. The perpetrator was 17 year-old Dunedin teenager Christopher Lewis. Lewis electrocuted himself in prison in 1997 while awaiting trial for an unrelated murder.

2019 Christchurch mosque shootings
After the 15 March 2019 white supremacist terrorist attack on two mosques in Christchurch, the failure of the SIS and other NZ state agencies to pay adequate attention to the 'far right', and to detect the terrorist was strongly criticised. Green Party MP Marama Davidson and Tuhoe activist and artist Tame Iti, among others, suggested that the SIS and other state security and intelligence agencies had the wrong people under surveillance, including Muslim communities, Māori, and environmental activists. The spokesperson for the Islamic Women's Council of New Zealand, Anjum Rahman, voiced frustration at the failure of the SIS to take Muslim community concerns about racist violence and the rise of the alt-right in New Zealand seriously.

Prime Minister Jacinda Ardern announced that there would be an inquiry into the circumstances that led to the mosque attacks and what the relevant agencies (SIS, Government Communications Security Bureau (GCSB), police, Customs and Immigration) knew about the individual and the accused's activities. The official Royal Commission into the attacks was made public on 8 December 2020, and found that intelligence agencies including the NZSIS and GCSB had placed excessive focus on Islamist terrorism, at the expense of detecting far-right and White supremacist threats.

On 22 March 2021, the NZSIS released an internal review  known as the "Arotake review" exploring its decision-making process prior to the Christchurch mosque shootings. The review had been conducted by a counter-terrorism expert from the Five Eyes. In late March 2021, NZSIS Director-General Rebecca Kitteridge indicated that the NZSIS would be paying more attention to far right and white supremacist groups.

2020 Zhenhua Data leak
On 16 September 2020, the NZSIS confirmed that it was evaluating the "potential risks and security concerns" of the Chinese intelligence firm Zhenhua Data's "Overseas Key Individuals Database." The database had profiled 730 New Zealanders including Prime Minister Jacinda Ardern's mother Laurell, father Ross, sister Louse, former Prime Minister John Key's son Max, sportswoman Barbara Kendall, Māori leaders Dame Naida Glavish, former Minister of New Zealand Ruth Richardson, and Chief Censor David Shanks. Zhenhua's database had been leaked to the American academic and China expert Professor Chris Balding, who passed the information to Australian cyber security firm Internet 2.0. The data leak was covered by several international media including the Australian Financial Review, the Washington Post, the Indian Express, the Globe and Mail, and Il Foglio.

2021 disclosure of counterintelligence operations
In late March 2021, the NZSIS's Director-General Rebecca Kitteridge confirmed that its agents had discovered a New Zealander who was gathering information for an unidentified foreign intelligence agency about individuals whom an unidentified foreign state regards as dissidents. University of Canterbury political scientist Anne-Marie Brady claimed that the spy had been working for China. In addition, the spy agency confirmed that, during the period between 2019 and 2020, it had disrupted the efforts of a person working for a foreign state to influence senior policy-makers, investigated the activities of individuals linked to several foreign states, and investigated foreign efforts to influence local and central government figures and New Zealand's academic sector.

In late October 2021, Radio New Zealand reported that the NZSIS had designated a Chinese couple as a national security threat, prompting Immigration New Zealand to block the couple's residency applications. The NZSIS asserted that the husband and wife had assisted Chinese intelligence services and deliberately concealed the amount of contact they had maintained with them. The couple had migrated to New Zealand in 2016 under the entrepreneur work visa scheme and established a business. The husband's lawyer countered that the man had maintained legitimate contact with Chinese intelligence services while working at a private company in China because he had helped employees to obtain visas to enter China for business purposes.

Spying on Nicky Hager
In November 2022 the SIS paid journalist Nicky Hager $66,000 after unlawfully accessing his phone records. The spying was in response to Hager's book Other People's Wars, and attempted unsuccessfully to identify his sources. The Inspector-General of Intelligence and Security found that the SIS had no lawful power to investigate, and had not showed the kind of caution expected in a free and democratic society.

Access to records
Until a few years ago the SIS was reluctant to release information either under the Privacy Act or the Official Information Act. However it has  adopted a much more open policy: individuals who apply for their files will be given extensive information, with only sensitive details (such as details of sources or information provided by overseas agencies) removed.  A letter to the Director is all that is required in order to obtain information.

In certain respects,  the SIS still fails to meet its obligations under the Privacy Act but in these cases there is a right of appeal to the Privacy Commissioner. The Privacy Act does not cover deceased people but their files are available under the Official Information Act. The service is also required to release other information such as files on organizations but it is reluctant to do so, claiming that it has to perform extensive research in order to provide such information.

See also
 New Zealand intelligence agencies
 Foreign espionage in New Zealand
 Canadian Security Intelligence Service

Further reading

 NZSIS Annual Reports http://www.nzsis.govt.nz/publications/annual-reports/

References

External links
 
 New Zealand Security Intelligence Service Act

New Zealand intelligence agencies
New Zealand Public Service departments